Saddle Club is a neighborhood in northern Lexington, Kentucky, United States. Its boundaries are New Circle Road to the west and north, Versailles Road to the south, and Viley Road to the east.

Saddle Club's development began in the early 2000s.

Neighborhood statistics
 Area: 
 Population: 14
 Population density: 212 people per square mile
 Median household income: $53,635

References

Neighborhoods in Lexington, Kentucky